Cyana detrita is a moth of the family Erebidae first described by Francis Walker in 1854. The male has a wingspan of 15 mm and the female's is 19 mm.

Distribution
It is distributed throughout the countries of India, Sri Lanka, China, Myanmar, Sumatra, Borneo, Java and parts of Africa.

References

External links

Moths of Asia
Moths described in 1854
Taxa named by Francis Walker (entomologist)